Nanshi Subdistrict is a subdistrict in Baota District, Yan'an, Shaanxi, China. The subdistrict had a population of 57,320 as of 2010.

History 
In 1972, the Nanshi People's Commune was established. In 1984, the Nanshi People's Commune was abolished, and Nanshi Subdistrict was established.

Demographics 
According to the 2010 Chinese Census, the subdistrict's population totaled 57,320. In the 2000 Chinese Census, the subdistrict's population was 37,177. In 1996, the subdistrict's estimated population approximated 60,000.

Administrative divisions 
As of 2020, the subdistrict administers nine residential communities and two villages.

Residential communities 
The subdistrict's nine residential communities are as follows:

 Qilipu Community
 Dufuchuan Community
 Shichanggou Community
 Nanqiao Community
 Majiawan Community
 Liangshuijin Community
 Nanguan Community
 Huize Community
 Baoyuan Community

Villages 
The subdistrict's two villages are as follows:

 Shichanggou Village
 Qilipu Village

See also
List of township-level divisions of Shaanxi

References

Coordinates on Wikidata
Subdistricts of the People's Republic of China
Township-level divisions of Shaanxi
Baota District